Sverrisson is an Icelandic surname. Notable people with the name include:

Eyjólfur Sverrisson (born 1968), Icelandic footballer and football coach
Skúli Sverrisson (born 1966), Icelandic composer and bass guitarist

Icelandic-language surnames